Europium bromide may refer to:

 Europium(II) bromide (europium dibromide), EuBr2
 Europium(III) bromide (europium tribromide), EuBr3